The fifth season of the American television series Arrow premiered on The CW on October 5, 2016, and concluded on May 24, 2017, with a total of 23 episodes. The series is based on the DC Comics character Green Arrow, a costumed crime-fighter created by Mort Weisinger and George Papp, and is set in the Arrowverse, sharing continuity with other Arrowverse television series. The showrunners for this season were Marc Guggenheim and Wendy Mericle. Stephen Amell stars as Oliver Queen, with principal cast members David Ramsey as John Diggle, Willa Holland as Thea Queen, Emily Bett Rickards as Felicity Smoak, and Paul Blackthorne as Quentin Lance also returning from previous seasons. They are joined by Echo Kellum as Curtis Holt, who was promoted to a series regular from his recurring status in the previous season, and new cast member Josh Segarra.

The series follows billionaire playboy Oliver Queen (Stephen Amell), who claimed to have spent five years shipwrecked on Lian Yu, a mysterious island in the North China Sea, before returning home to Starling City (later renamed "Star City") to fight crime and corruption as a secret vigilante whose weapon of choice is a bow and arrow. In the fifth season, Oliver trains a new group of vigilantes, Rene Ramirez / Wild Dog (Rick Gonzalez), Curtis Holt / Mister Terrific, Evelyn Sharp / Artemis (Madison McLaughlin), and Rory Regan / Ragman (Joe Dinicol) to join his war on crime following Laurel Lance's death and Diggle and Thea's resignation. He also recruits a new Black Canary; former police detective Dinah Drake (Juliana Harkavy). Oliver tries to balance vigilantism with his new role as mayor, yet is threatened by the mysterious and deadly Prometheus (Josh Segarra), who has a connection to Oliver's past. Oliver is also forced to contend with Prometheus' ally Black Siren (Katie Cassidy), an Earth-2 criminal doppelganger of Laurel. The season features flashbacks to Oliver's fifth year since he was presumed dead, where he joins the Bratva in Russia as part of a plot to assassinate Konstantin Kovar (Dolph Lundgren). There, he meets and is trained by Talia al Ghul (Lexa Doig), as a hooded archer, before returning to Lian Yu.

The series was renewed for its fifth season on March 11, 2016, and filming began in Vancouver, British Columbia, Canada on July 5, 2016, and ended in April 2017. The season received positive reviews from critics who viewed it as an improvement over the third and fourth seasons. This season includes the third annual Arrowverse crossover with TV series The Flash and new spin-off Legends of Tomorrow, and also features Kara Danvers / Supergirl from Supergirl. The season was released on DVD and Blu-ray on September 18 and 19, 2017. The series was renewed for a sixth season on January 8, 2017.

Episodes

Cast and characters

Main 
 Stephen Amell as Oliver Queen / Green Arrow
 David Ramsey as John Diggle / Spartan
 Willa Holland as Thea Queen / Speedy
 Emily Bett Rickards as Felicity Smoak / Overwatch
 Echo Kellum as Curtis Holt / Mister Terrific
 Josh Segarra as Adrian Chase / Prometheus
 Paul Blackthorne as Quentin Lance

Recurring 
 Katie Cassidy as Laurel Lance and Laurel Lance / Black Canary
 Rick Gonzalez as Rene Ramirez / Wild Dog
 Chad L. Coleman as Tobias Church
 Adrian Holmes as Frank Pike
 Mike Dopud as Viktor
 David Nykl as Anatoly Knyazev
 Tyler Ritter as Billy Malone
 Madison McLaughlin as Evelyn Sharp / Artemis
 Joe Dinicol as Rory Regan / Ragman
Audrey Marie Anderson as Lyla Michaels
 Carly Pope as Susan Williams
 Dolph Lundgren as Konstantin Kovar
 David Meunier as Ishmael Gregor
John Barrowman as Malcolm Merlyn / Dark Archer
 Juliana Harkavy as Dinah Drake / Black Canary
 Lexa Doig as Talia al Ghul
 Kacey Rohl as Alena Whitlock

Guest

Production

Development 
On March 11, 2016, The CW renewed Arrow for a fifth season. Marc Guggenheim and Wendy Mericle served as the season's showrunners.

Writing 
While Arrow began as a "grounded, gritty" series that focused on realism, following the introduction of The Flash in the same universe, it started embracing fantastical elements. Stephen Amell revealed that, in contrast, the Big Bad of the fifth season would not have any superpowers, and also confirmed that the season would follow the more realistic approach of the first two seasons. Nevertheless, he later confirmed that the events of The Flash season 2 finale, which ended with Barry Allen / Flash traveling back in time to save his mother from murder, would affect the events of the fifth season of Arrow. Guggenheim expanded upon this, saying John Diggle would be the most notable to be affected. The second episode of The Flash season 3 reveals that Diggle's daughter Sara has been erased from existence and replaced with a son named John Diggle Jr. as a result of Barry's time travel.

Guggenheim described "legacy" as the theme of the fifth season: "The idea [is] Oliver honoring Black Canary’s [Katie Cassidy] legacy after [Laurel Lance's] death last year [...] What we’re doing is we’re dramatizing Oliver's desire to grow, move forward, and evolve, but this concept of legacy keeps threatening to pull him back to the early days", and that Oliver would be indirectly responsible for the creation behind Prometheus, the season's Big Bad. Although Guggenheim initially stated this Prometheus was an original creation not based on the comics character of the same name created by Grant Morrison, his civilian identity is later revealed as Adrian Chase. The comics version of the character is Vigilante, but Mericle explained he was made Prometheus for the series "because everybody would be thinking, 'Of course he's going to be Vigilante,' [...] We thought it would be a really fun twist to… take the comic-book mythology and turn it on its head and see what kind of story we can mine from a surprise like that."

Season five's flashbacks focus on Oliver's time in Russia, and explain how he learned Russian and received the Bratva tattoo. It is also the final season to focus on the flashbacks depicting Oliver's five-year period as a castaway. Guggenheim revealed that, unlike previous seasons, the fifth season finale would not have Star City in danger, and would not even take place there. Instead, the episode, titled "Lian Yu" takes place on the island of the same name.

Casting 
Main cast members Stephen Amell, David Ramsey, Willa Holland, Emily Bett Rickards and Paul Blackthorne return from previous seasons as Oliver Queen / Green Arrow, John Diggle / Spartan, Thea Queen, Felicity Smoak and Quentin Lance, respectively. Echo Kellum, who recurred as Curtis Holt in season four, was promoted to series regular for season five, while Josh Segarra joined the season as Adrian Chase. Michael Dorn voiced the character when disguised as Prometheus. Katie Cassidy, who starred as Laurel Lance in the first four seasons, returned as the character in a guest capacity, and recurred as the character's Earth-2 doppelganger Black Siren, a character introduced in season two of The Flash. John Barrowman, who portrayed Malcolm Merlyn on Arrow as a regular during seasons two and three, signed a contract with Warner Bros. Television that allowed him to continue being a regular on Arrow as well as the other Arrowverse shows, including The Flash and Legends of Tomorrow. Former series regulars Susanna Thompson and Manu Bennett returned to the season in guest roles as Moira Queen and Slade Wilson, respectively. Thea was significantly absent during the season, and Guggenheim explained that Holland was only contracted to appear in 14 of the season's 23 episodes.

Chad L. Coleman recurred in the first few episodes as crime lord Tobias Church. The character is not based on any existing DC Comics character; Coleman called him "Jay Z, Dr. Dre, and Suge Knight all rolled into one". Rick Gonzalez recurs in the role of Wild Dog, based on the DC Comics character of the same name. However, his civilian name for the series is Rene Ramirez, unlike the comics where it is Jack Wheeler. Gonzalez said he auditioned for the season without knowing what role he would play, until the series' costume designer Maya Mani told him he would be playing Wild Dog; Gonzalez was surprised since he expected he would be cast as a non-vigilante. Madison McLaughlin, who previously appeared in the season four episode "Canary Cry" as Evelyn Sharp, a teenager who briefly assumed the Black Canary mantle, returned for the fifth season in a recurring capacity with the character now assuming the moniker Artemis, named after the comics character Artemis Crock. In November 2016, it was announced that Juliana Harkavy would play Tina Boland in a recurring role; her character was later revealed to be Dinah Drake, named after the first Black Canary in the comics.

Design 
Maya Mani returned to design costumes for the fifth season. Oliver's Green Arrow costume of the season was designed to look almost exactly like the one worn in season four, one notable change being the re-introduction of sleeves from previous costumes, which the fourth season costume eschewed. In the season, Diggle replaces his Spartan helmet, which was introduced in season four, with a new one. Ramsey said this new helmet can do "extraordinary things", apart from being just about conceallment. Concept artist Andy Poon said the new helmet offers Diggle "full protection". He added that, since Diggle's codename is Spartan, he decided to make the helmet resemble "an actual spartan helmet design". The earlier helmet was criticized by fans for its resemblance to that worn by the Marvel Comics character Magneto and Poon, a comic book fan himself, thought the new helmet would fix "the issues regarding some of the fan feedback about [the older helmet] looking similar to other comic book characters". The Wild Dog costume was designed to look exactly as it does in the comics, by consisting of simply a sweatshirt and hockey gear. Gonzalez confirmed it reflects who the character is. Dinah Drake's vigilante costume in the season includes a mask resembling the Black Canary mask in the comics, along with a leather jacket.

Filming 
Filming for the season began on July 5, 2016 in Vancouver, and ended in April 2017.

Arrowverse tie-ins 
During the fifth season, Arrow was a part of the "Invasion!" crossover event with The Flash and Legends of Tomorrow. The event also saw Melissa Benoist reprising her role as Kara Danvers / Supergirl from Supergirl. The Arrow portion of the crossover is also the series' 100th episode.

Release

Broadcast 
The season began airing in the United States on The CW on October 5, 2016, and completed its 23-episode run on May 24, 2017.

Home media 
The season was released on DVD on September 18, 2017, and on Blu-ray the following day. It began streaming on Netflix on June 1, 2017.

Reception

Critical response 
The review aggregator Rotten Tomatoes reported an 88% approval rating based on 13 critics reviews, with an average rating of 7.38 out of 10. The website's critical consensus reads, "No stranger to dramatic twists and turns, season five of Arrow continues to introduce new villains and surprise viewers despite some inconsistency."

Jesse Schedeen of IGN gave the entire season a rating of 8.7 out of 10. He said the season's biggest flaw was "that it tried to juggle more characters and conflicts than was really feasible", but praised the writers for downplaying Oliver-Felicity's romance in favor of focusing on Felicity's induction into Helix. He called Prometheus "the series' best villain since Deathstroke" due to Segarra's performance and the "very personal nature of his feud with Oliver Queen", adding that the "personal nature of that conflict tended to bring out the best in Amell's acting". Schedeen noted that the season's flashbacks suffered from some of the same problems in the flashbacks of season 3 and 4 which did "little more than filling space and drawing pointless parallels between past and present", but still called the season 5 flashbacks "a significant improvement. It helps that the flashbacks were used to fill in a key hole in the Arrow tapestry". He added that while the finales of season 3 and 4 only managed to worsen them, in contrast the season 5 finale "proved to be not just the best episode of Season 5, but of the series as a whole". Schedeen concluded with verdict that the series "bounced back from a prolonged slump in Season 5, proving that the series still has plenty of life left."

Reviewing the season premiere, Caroline Preece of Den of Geek called it "a return to the heights of season one in all the best ways". She praised it for returning to the series' grounded and gritty nature, saying "This is what Arrow should always have been – the slightly grimy street level counterpart to the ever-expanding roster of cheesier, brighter series like Supergirl or Legends of Tomorrow. It should be the Batman to your Superman." Tyler McCarthy of the same website called the season finale "mixed bag to say the least, but it really came together in the end. Season five had a lot riding on it, especially after the shark-jumping events of season four [...] In the end, the show did its job and delivered a complicated crime drama that factored masked heroes in as key cogs in the larger machine – with some aliens thrown in for good measure." Reviewing the same episode, Alasdair Wilkins of The A.V. Club said, "Taken in isolation, "Lian Yu" is a strong but probably not superlative episode. Other episodes have had bigger action beats, better observed character moments, stronger points to make about who Oliver is and what his existence as the Green Arrow means. But this episode climbs into the uppermost echelon of Arrow episodes because it taps directly into everything that has come before it."

Ratings

Accolades 

|-
! scope="row" rowspan="10" | 2017
| rowspan="3" | Leo Awards
| Best Cinematography Dramatic Series
| data-sort-value="Whiting-Hewlett, Shamus" | Shamus Whiting-Hewlett ("Sins of the Father")
| 
| 
|-
| Best Lead Performance by a Female Dramatic Series
| data-sort-value="Rickards, Emily Bett" | Emily Bett Rickards ("Who Are You?")
| 
| 
|-
| Best Stunt Coordination Dramatic Series
| data-sort-value="Braconnier, Curtis" | Curtis Braconnier, Eli Zagoudakis ("What We Leave Behind")
| 
| 
|-
| MTV Movie & TV Awards
| Best Hero
| data-sort-value="Amell, Stephen" | Stephen Amell
| 
| 
|-
| People's Choice Awards
| Favorite Network TV Sci-Fi/Fantasy
| data-sort-value="Arrow" | Arrow
| 
| 
|-
| Saturn Awards
| Best Superhero Adaptation Television Series
| data-sort-value="Arrow" | Arrow
| 
| 
|-
| rowspan="4" | Teen Choice Awards
| Choice Action TV Actor
| data-sort-value="Amell, Stephen" | Stephen Amell
| 
| 
|-
| Choice Action TV Actress
| data-sort-value="Rickards, Emily Bett" | Emily Bett Rickards
| 
| 
|-
| Choice Action TV Show
| data-sort-value="Arrow" | Arrow
| 
| 
|-
| Choice TV Villain
| data-sort-value="Segarra, Josh" | Josh Segarra
| 
| 
|}

Notes

References

External links 

 
 

Arrow (TV series) seasons
2016 American television seasons
2017 American television seasons
Television series set in 2011
Television series set in 2012